Gaston Cyriel Durnez (9 September 1928 – 22 November 2019) was a Flemish columnist, journalist and writer. He worked for the newspaper De Standaard, and was one of the founders of the Encyclopedie van de Vlaamse Beweging. He was also the writer of De Geschiedenis van Sleenovia (1965), a comic strip by Willy Vandersteen and Edward De Rop, featuring characters from Marc Sleen's The Adventures of Nero, which was subject of a fierce copyright battle between the newspapers De Standaard and Het Volk.

Bibliography
 Muzenissen (1954)
 Rijmenam (1956)
 Wiltzang (1960)
 Hooikoorts (1962)
 Kermis (1963)
 Maria Rosseels (1963)
 Slalom (1963)
 Duizend kussen voor iedereen (1965)
 Sire (1966)
 Denkend aan Nederland (1968)
 Zondag in de week (1969)
 Mijn leven onder de Belgen (1970)
 Jullie worden later gek dan wij (1971)
 Kijk, paps, een Belg (1973)
 Kleinbeeld (1973)
 Sun Corner Bar (1980)
 Een vogel in de brievenbus (1981)
 Vlaamse schrijvers, vijfentwintig portretten (1982)
 De engel op het eiland (1983)
 Loekie Zvonik (1983)
 Vlaamse humor omnibus Deel: 3 (1983)
 Van Leeuwtje tot D.C. (1984)
 De Standaard (1985)
 Klein Belgisch woordenboek (1985)
 De goede Fee, pasfoto van Felix Timmermans (1986)
 God is een Sinjoor (1987)
 Zeg mij waar de bloemen zijn (1988)
 Wij zijn allemaal amateurs (1991)
 Het lied mijner kindsheid, of Een lepel herinneringen (1992)
 Wie betaalt het gelach? (1994)
 Paspoort (1998)
 Felix Timmermans (2000)

See also
 Flemish literature
 Flemish movement

Sources

External links
 Gaston Durnez
 Gaston Durnez

1928 births
2019 deaths
Flemish writers
Flemish activists
Flemish journalists
Belgian humorists
Belgian columnists
Belgian comics writers
Belgian journalists
Male journalists